Courtown is a village in County Wexford, Ireland. It was developed after Lord Courtown ordered the construction of a harbour during the Famine years, 1839–1846. The economic boost of the new harbour led to a small village developing with fishing being the primary economy of the village. Courtown is situated on the Irish Sea coast and with the recent development during the Celtic Tiger years, has merged into the adjoining village of Riverchapel. It lies on the R742 regional road.

Development and amenities

The name Courtown originally applied to a townland in North Wexford, 4 kilometres east of Gorey town. The townland was home to the seat of Lord Courtown during the 18th and 19th centuries. Courtown House was demolished in 1962. The remains of his private church and cemetery can still be seen in the townland. Today it is home to Courtown Golf Club and Kiltennel Church.

In the late 20th and early 21st century, significant urbanisation has taken place, especially in Riverchapel, just south of Courtown Harbour. Large housing estates are now home to commuters working in Dublin. While the population of Courtown is somewhat smaller, the census combines the area of Courtown, Riverchapel and Ardamine. As of the 2006 census the population of this area was 1,421, and had grown to 3,591 by the time of the 2016 census.

Courtown is home to 'The Dinky Take-Away', serving the "best chips in Ireland", as voted on Marty Whelan's morning show on the 2FM radio station. Courtown also has a confectionary shop, ice-cream shop, and hair salons.

The town features crazy golf, amusement rides, ten-pin bowling, a golf course, as well as a beach and forest park. Courtown is also home to a Class D RNLI inshore lifeboat.

Seal Rescue Ireland (SRI), a charity organisation that works to rescue, rehabilitate and release sick or injured seals, is based in Courtown.

Transport
There is a bus once a day (except on Sundays) to and from Gorey, departing in the morning and returning in the afternoon. On Mondays and Saturdays Bus Éireann route 379 operates and continues to Wexford via Curracloe. Route 879 operates on Tuesdays, Thursdays and Fridays. On Wednesdays, the service is provided by the Rural Roadrunner bus operated by Wexford Local Development.

The nearest station is Gorey railway station, around 7 kilometres away.

Tourism 
As a harbour and seaside village, there is a high tourism rate during the months of the summer (May–August). Local tourist accommodation types include a number of bed and breakfasts, guesthouses, and caravan and holiday parks.

History 

The name 'Courtown' dates to 1278, but the harbour was not built until the mid 1800s as a response by Lord Courtown to the Great Famine, and cost £25,000 to complete. Courtown was by then already well known for its beaches, but the presence of the harbour made it a fashionable destination, with people from Dublin and the midlands frequenting the village and beaches. Its popularity as a summer holiday resort for Dublin people increased after 1863, when the railway line from Dublin reached nearby Gorey.

See also
 List of towns and villages in Ireland
 List of RNLI stations

References

External links

 Courtownharbour.com - Website for Courtown Harbour

Seaside resorts in the Republic of Ireland
Towns and villages in County Wexford
Beaches of County Wexford